Mihika Varma is an Indian television actress and former model. She won the Miss India International title in 2004 and represented India in the Miss International 2004 competition. She started her acting career by debuting in the series Viruddh. Varma Poratyed The Character of Mihika Khanna in Yeh Hai Mohabbatein .  She played a supporting role in the serial Baat Hamari Pakki Hai. She played the role of Fiza in Yeh Hai Aashiqui. She later got married and left her acting career to settle with her husband in the US.

Personal life 
Mihika Verma has a younger brother, Mishkat Varma who is also an actor.

Mihika married US-based NRI Anand Kapai on April 29, 2016 in Delhi when she left Yeh Hai Mohabbatein . They have a son named Izaan Kapai.

Television

References

External links

Female models from Mumbai
Living people
Indian television actresses
Indian beauty pageant winners
1985 births
Actresses from Mumbai
Actresses in Hindi television
21st-century Indian actresses
Miss International 2004 delegates